The Cameroon national under-20 football team, more commonly known as The Indomitable Lions, represents Cameroon in international youth football competitions. The Stade Omnisports (Stade Ahmadou Ahidjo) in Yaounde is used for home games.

Appearances

Honors
African Youth Championship
 Winners (1): 1995
 Runners-up (4): 1981, 1993, 2009, 2011
 Third Place (1): 1999
Jeux de la Francophonie
 Third Place: 1997
 Fourth Place: 2001, 2005

Squad
The following squad was selected for the 2023 Africa U-20 Cup of Nations.

Past squads
The squad that played the 2011 FIFA U-20 World Cup

Head coach:  Martin Mpile Ndtoungou

References

under-20
African national under-20 association football teams